Varroville is a suburb of Sydney, in the state of New South Wales, Australia. Varroville is located 46 kilometres south-west of the Sydney central business district, in the local government area of the City of Campbelltown and is part of the Macarthur region. Varroville forms part of the scenic hills on the north-west side of the M5 South Western Motorway between Campbelltown and the Camden Valley Way.  Of all Sydney suburbs, Varroville has the highest proportion of residents with PhDs.

Sydney's newest General Cemetery, the first in over 50 years, is being built as of 2023, at Macarthur Memorial Park, Varroville (https://www.abc.net.au/news/2023-01-23/sydney-is-running-out-of-burial-space/101881570)

History
Varroville was originally a farm called Varro Ville. Townson developed the farm and grew a vineyard and raised cattle. Townson died in 1827 and ownership passed onto his brother, Captain John Townson of Van Diemen's Land, to two nieces residing in England and to his nephew, Captain John Witts, R.M.  In 1837 the farm was sold to Charles Sturt a famous explorer who moved in from Mittagong. James Raymond took over in 1839. Alfred Cheeke, a supreme court judge was a later owner. By 1900 Varro Ville was a leading dairy farm in the Campbelltown area. The farmhouse fell into disrepair, but has been restored by the new owners and the National Trust. The name Varroville was officially adopted in 1972 for the area between Raby and Denham Court. The area was previously part of Minto.

Heritage listings
Varroville has a number of heritage-listed sites, including:
 196 St Andrews Road: Varroville (homestead)

Landmarks
The Mount Carmel Novitiate was built in 1966, while Mount Carmel High School opened in 1986.

Sport
Kooringa Reserve is located directly across the road from Mount Carmel High School. This is the home ground to the St Mary's Eagle Vale Soccer Club the largest soccer club in the Macarthur District.

Transport
The main road in Varroville is St Andrews Road.  This was originally a dirt track, skirting St Andrews farm, owned by Andrew Thompson.  Other roads named after saints are St James and St David.

References

External links

  [CC-By-SA]

Suburbs of Sydney